Lecanodiaspis is a genus of scale insects of the family Lecanodiaspididae described by Targioni Tozzetti in 1869.

References

Hemiptera of Australia
Lecanodiaspididae